Martina Centofanti (born 19 May 1998) is an Italian group rhythmic gymnast. A member of the national squad since 2015, Centofanti ascended to prominence on the international scene at the 2016 Summer Olympics, where she and fellow rhythmic gymnasts Sofia Lodi, Camilla Patriarca, Marta Pagnini, and Alessia Maurelli attained a total score of 35.549 on the combination of hoops, ribbons, and clubs for the fourth spot in the final, slipping her team off the podium by nearly two tenths of a point. 

She won a bronze medal, in Women's rhythmic group all-around, at the 2020 Summer Olympics.

She is the 2018 World Group All-around silver medalist and two-time European (2018, 2021) Group All-around silver medalist.

Career

Junior
In 2013, she was a captain of junior national group, together with Letizia Cicconcelli, Cecilia Merriggiola, Maria Vilucchi, Aurora Peluzzi and Giulia Muscolino, coached by Julieta Cantaluppi and Kristina Ghiurova. They placed 6th in Group All-around and 5 Hoops final at the 2013 Junior European Championships in Vienna, Austria.

Detailed Olympic results

Personal life
She is a daughter of Italian former footballer Felice Centofanti.

References

External links 
 
 Martina Centofanti at the Italian Olympic Committee (CONI)

1998 births
Living people
Italian rhythmic gymnasts
Gymnasts from Rome
Gymnasts at the 2016 Summer Olympics
Olympic gymnasts of Italy
European Games competitors for Italy
Gymnasts at the 2015 European Games
Gymnasts at the 2019 European Games
Medalists at the Rhythmic Gymnastics European Championships
Medalists at the Rhythmic Gymnastics World Championships
Gymnasts at the 2020 Summer Olympics
Medalists at the 2020 Summer Olympics
Olympic medalists in gymnastics
Olympic bronze medalists for Italy
21st-century Italian women